"" ("The Commissioner") is a song recorded by Austrian artist Falco in 1981. The song was written by Robert Ponger and Falco. It reached the top of the charts in many European countries. The cover version as an English translation by the group After the Fire in 1982 had greater success in other countries.

Background
The music of "Der Kommissar" was written by producer Robert Ponger and intended for Reinhold Bilgeri. After Bilgeri rejected it, as he felt the song was too soft, Falco reworked it by adding his text to the partly mixed down instrumental track.

Falco would have preferred to release "Helden von heute" as the main side (A-side), because the melody hook of "Der Kommissar" seemed too similar to the bass hook of Rick James' "Super Freak" from which Ponger had borrowed it after its release earlier in 1981, but the record company wanted "Der Kommissar" to be on the A-side, because they felt it had more potential. The record company decided on a Y- vs. X-side release for Austria and an A-side for Germany, which was vindicated when "Der Kommissar" reached No. 1 in both countries in January 1982. After this success, Falco's management decided to release "Der Kommissar" (as an A-side) in other countries as well.

The song recorded for other side of the record, the pop-rock "" ("heroes of today"), is a tribute to David Bowie's "Heroes". It was recorded in Berlin; Falco claimed in an interview that he went to Berlin to follow the "tracks" left there by Bowie, with his albums "Heroes" and Low.

Commercial performance 
The song reached No. 74 on the US Cashbox chart in 1983, while failing to chart on the US Billboard Hot 100 or on the UK Singles Chart. Falco would break through with major hits in those countries two albums later, with "Rock Me Amadeus" and "Vienna Calling" in 1986. Updated remixes of "Der Kommissar" were released by Falco in 1991, 1998, and posthumously in 2008.

Music video
In the U.S. official music ideo, Falco is shown in front of a blue screen with stock footage of U.S. police cars driving  the streets at night with blue lights on playing behind him. Falco is lip-syncing the song, partly dancing and at the beginning running in place, to simulate running from the cops. In the European official music video he is sitting in a kind of interrogation room wearing a white suit and smoking.

Charts

Weekly charts

Year-end charts

After the Fire version

In mid-1982, British rock band After the Fire recorded an English version, also titled "Der Kommissar", and released it as a single, but the record floundered. Coming off a tour opening for Van Halen, After the Fire was working on material for a new album when in December 1982, the group announced onstage during a concert that they were disbanding. Both the After the Fire and Falco versions were rising on the Canadian charts at the time, but neither had cracked the US pop charts. Around that time, American singer Laura Branigan began working on her second studio album, Branigan 2, and she recorded "Deep in the Dark", a new song written over the melody and arrangement of "Der Kommissar" which was prepared for release. Then the After the Fire version finally hit the US Billboard Hot 100 on 22 February 1983, and started rising. Though its version barely nicked their home country's Top 50, in 1983 the song's music video received extensive airplay on MTV propelling its popularity on US radio. The song entered the US top 40 on 5 March 1983, peaking at No. 5, and spending a total of 14 weeks in the top 40. The single was released under the Epic label, with a catalog number of 03559. Amidst all this renewed attention to the composition, Falco's own version, which had done well in some US markets but not charted nationally, was re-released, but the German-language record remained essentially a novelty hit there, charting concurrently with the After the Fire version but not rising above No. 74 on the Cashbox chart.

In Canada, Falco's version had peaked at No. 11 the same late-January week that After the Fire's version peaked at No. 12. After the Fire's record company, CBS, pleaded with the band to regroup, but to no avail. While UK promotional singles for "Deep in the Dark" were pressed (the After the Fire version missed the UK top 40 and the Falco version failed to chart there), Branigan's record company, Atlantic, officially released "Solitaire" in the United States, where that song peaked at No. 7.

Charts

Weekly charts

Year-end charts

In Popular Culture 

 in "Les Apparences" - 2020 film by Marc Fitoussi, the character played by Karin Viard dances to Der Kommissar.

References

Bibliography

 

1981 songs
1981 singles
1982 singles
1983 singles
A&M Records singles
After the Fire songs
Epic Records singles
Falco (musician) songs
Laura Branigan songs
Number-one singles in Austria
Number-one singles in Germany
Number-one singles in Italy
Number-one singles in Spain
Songs about police officers
Songs written by Falco (musician)
Songs written by Robert Ponger